Hannah Humphrey (active 1745–1818 in London) was a leading London print seller of the 18th century, significant in particular for being the publisher of much of James Gillray's output.

Biography 
The sister of William Humphrey, Hannah Humphrey first started selling prints from her brother's premises. She struck out on her own in 1778 or 1779, when she first established a printshop in St Martin's Lane. Several woman print sellers ran successful businesses in 18th-century London—for example, Mary Darly, Susan Vivares, and Elizabeth Jackson. Humphrey was preeminent among them and became one of the top two print sellers in London, the other one being Samuel Fores. Her shop in St James was visited by a fashionable clientele and had a large stock of social and political caricature, including caricature portraits of leading society figures. Notable artists she published beside Gillray included Thomas Rowlandson and James Sayers.

She moved premises a number of times: from 18 Old Bond Street (1778–83) to 51 New Bond Street (1783–89), to 18 Old Bond Street (1790–94), to 37 New Bond Street (1794–97) and finally settling in 27 St James's Street (1797–1817), depicted in the print Very Slippy-Weather. James Gillray lodged with her for much of his working life, and she looked after him after his lapse into insanity around 1810 until his death in 1815.  In Two-Penny Whist,  the character shown second from the left, an ageing lady with eyeglasses and a bonnet, is widely believed to be a depiction of Humphrey. She was known as Mrs Humphrey although she remained a spinster for all her life.

References 

This article incorporates text from a publication now in the public domain: Chisholm, Hugh, ed. (1911). "Gillray, James". Encyclopædia Britannica. 12 (11th ed.). Cambridge University Press. pp. 23–24.

Publishers (people) from London
Year of death unknown
Year of birth unknown
18th-century publishers (people)
19th-century publishers (people)
18th-century English businesspeople
19th-century English businesspeople
18th-century English businesswomen
19th-century English businesswomen